Libby Creek is a small creek in Thurston County, Washington. Libby Creek flows into Chapman Bay. The name honors the Libby family, specifically George A. Libby (1833–1898), who homesteaded at the North end of the trail that is now Libby Road. The Libby family still currently resides in Thurston County.

References

Rivers of Washington (state)
Rivers of Thurston County, Washington